Tetramethylammonium pentafluoroxenate is the chemical compound with the formula N(CH3)4XeF5. The  ion it contains was the first example of a pentagonal planar molecular geometry AX5E2 species. It was prepared by the reaction of N(CH3)4F with xenon tetrafluoride, N(CH3)4F being chosen because it can be prepared in anhydrous form and is readily soluble in organic solvents. The anion is planar, with the fluorine atoms in a slightly distorted pentagonal coordination (Xe–F bond lengths 197.9–203.4 pm, and F–X–F bond angles 71.5°–72.3°). Other salts have been prepared with sodium, cesium and rubidium, and vibrational spectra show that these contain the same planar ion. The isolated anion has the point group of D5h.

References

Fluoro complexes
Xenon(IV) compounds
Tetramethylammonium salts